A day is a unit of temporal measurement for a literal day or epoch of time.
Day, DAY or Days may also refer to:

Temporal 
 Daytime
 Awareness day, a date set by a major organisation or government to commemorate a cause of importance on a national or international level
 Synodic day, the time for any given celestial body to complete a rotation

People 
 Day (surname)
 Days (surname)
 Day9, alias of Sean Plott, former professional gamer and e-sports commentator
 John Day Smith *1845-1933), American lawyer, judge, and politician

Culture and entertainment 
 Day, an 1881 painting by William-Adolphe Bouguereau
 Days (film), a 2020 Taiwanese film
 Days of Our Lives, an American soap opera
 Days of Heaven, a 1978 American romantic period drama film

Literature 
 Day (Wiesel novel), a 1962 novel by Elie Wiesel
 Day (Kennedy novel), a 2007 novel by A. L. Kennedy
 "Days" (poem), a short poem by Philip Larkin
 Days (manga), a manga series by Tsuyoshi Yasuda

Music 
 DJ Day, American DJ, producer, and musician

Albums
 Days (album), by Real Estate, 2011
 Days, by Tim Knol, 2011
 Day, an EP by Jeong Se-woon, 2019

Songs
 "Days" (Alisa Mizuki song), 1997
 "Days" (Flow song), 2005
 "Days" (High and Mighty Color song), 2005
 "Days" (The Kinks song), 1968; covered by Kirsty MacColl, 1989
 "Days", a 1972 song by Steve Peregrin Took from the 1995 posthumous album The Missing Link To Tyrannosaurus Rex
 "Days"/"Green", by Ayumi Hamasaki, 2008
 "Day", by Katatonia from Brave Murder Day 
 "Days", by David Bowie from Reality

Geography

United States
 Day, California, an unincorporated community 
 Day, Florida, a census-designated place
 Day, Minnesota, an unincorporated community 
 Day, Missouri,. an unincorporated community
 Day, New York, a town
 Day, Wisconsin, a town
 Day County, South Dakota
 Day Township, Michigan
 Dayton International Airport, (IATA: DAY), Dayton, Ohio's main airport
 Days Canyon, a valley in Utah

Elsewhere
 , a hamlet in the municipality of Vallorbe, Vaud canton, Switzerland

Industry 
 Day (automobile), an automobile built in Detroit, Michigan, from 1911 to 1914
 John Day Company, an American publisher
 Day Software, an American/Swiss content management system vendor

Other
 Day language, a Mbum-Day language of southern Chad

See also 
 The Day (disambiguation)
 The Days (disambiguation)
 Day-Lewis, a surname
 Daye (disambiguation)
 Dayes, a surname
 Justice Day (disambiguation)
 Mars sol, a "day" on the planet Mars
 WDAY (disambiguation), media companies with the call letters DAY